Elijah Woods x Jamie Fine (pronounced Elijah Woods "ex" Jamie Fine) were a Canadian pop music duo that consisted of songwriter and producer Elijah Woods and singer-songwriter Jamie Fine. The pair met in Ottawa in 2014 and began independently producing music together shortly thereafter. In September 2017, the duo competed on the first season of Canadian reality music competition, The Launch, and released the single "Ain't Easy" through Big Machine Records in January 2018 following the initial airing of their episode. "Ain't Easy" has since been certified Platinum by Music Canada and topped the national adult contemporary airplay chart. In November 2020 it is reported that Woods and Fine have parted ways.

History
The duo of Elijah Woods and Jamie Fine was formed sometime in early 2014 when the two met at Algonquin College in Ottawa, Ontario, Canada. After Woods, who was enrolled at the time in the college's music program, heard a recording of Fine's voice on a friend's smartphone singing an original song titled "Falling Down", he was inspired to reach out to the singer to collaborate on music. They worked together for two or three years before releasing a string of digital singles in 2017, including "Serenade", which charted at number 48 on the national Canada CHR/Top 40 airplay chart.

2017–2020: The Launch and 8:47
In September 2017, the duo competed on the first season of Canadian reality music competition, The Launch. The series' second episode, which aired in January 2018, featured a handful of unsigned musical acts including Elijah Woods x Jamie Fine competing to have their version of the Ryan Tedder and Camila Cabello-written song, "Ain't Easy", released nationwide through Big Machine Records. After being selected as the winner, the duo's rendition of the song was released January 17, 2018. The song is the only coronation single from the series to reach the Canadian Hot 100, where "Ain't Easy" peaked at number 38. Music Canada certified the single Platinum in May 2018. The success of the song contributed to the duo winning the iHeartRadio MMVA for Best New Canadian Artist or Group in August 2018. It is the lead single from their debut EP 8:47.

Since partnering with Big Machine on the show, Elijah Woods x Jamie Fine has continued working on new music. In June 2018, the duo told iHeartRadio that they had produced over two album's worth of music and that the release of their debut album was likely "[not] too far off." The duo released their second major-label single, "Better Off", on August 24, 2018, the second single from the 8:47 EP. It has since become their second consecutive charting single on the Canadian Hot 100.

The EP's third single, "You", was released on February 14, 2019, the same day the EP went out for pre-order. The EP was released on March 8, 2019.

Members

Elijah Woods
Elijah was born and raised outside of Perth, Ontario. His mother owned the town's Sunflower Bakery and his father taught him to play guitar. Woods began producing music at the age of 7. He attended the music industry arts program at Algonquin College until his graduation in 2015.

Jamie Fine
Jamie was born and raised in the Centrepointe area of Ottawa. She was introduced to jazz and classical music by her parents, but did not begin singing until the age of 6, and only began performing in high school. Fine has graduated from the culinary arts program at Algonquin and has put her culinary career on hold to pursue music.

Discography

EPs

Singles

Promotional singles

Awards and nominations

References

Canadian musical duos
Canadian synthpop groups
Electronic music duos
Musical groups from Ottawa
Big Machine Records artists
Musical groups established in 2014
Year of birth missing (living people)
Musical groups disestablished in 2020
2014 establishments in Canada